Tempy is a locality in Victoria, Australia, located approximately 136 km from Mildura, Victoria and south of Ouyen.
The area was settled after the arrival of the railway, the Post Office opening on 18 July 1910.

The major industry in this region, The Mallee is farming, predominantly sheep and wheat.

Tempy Primary School opened in June 1910 on a site a mile south of the town. The building was moved to the town itself in 1914, and replaced by a new building in 1919 where the Roman Catholic Church later stood. It was replaced in 1925 by a new school on the present site.

Tempy West State School (No. 3978) opened five miles west of the town in late 1918 and closed in 1936.

References

Towns in Victoria (Australia)
Mallee (Victoria)